Beaumont Road is a housing estate located in Leyton in East London. It is the largest housing estate in the borough of Waltham Forest, and is now the last high rise estate (with 20-plus-storey towers) in Leyton. All neighbouring high rise estates (Oliver Close estate, Cathall, Boundary Road estate and Livingstone College estate) have been demolished. It is situated just south of the Bakers Arms, on Leyton High Road.

Original development 

The Beaumont Road Estate was built in two stages. Stage 1, approved in 1963, consisted of one 20-storey tower (containing 120 flats) called All Saints' Tower, while an extension to Stage 1 approved in 1965 consisted of another 20-storey tower (containing 120 flats) called St Paul's Tower. Stage 2, approved in 1966, consisted of one 20-storey tower (containing 120 flats) called St Catherine's Tower Altogether (containing 360 flats). In addition 23 low rise blocks (containing 538 flats) were also approved in 1966. Beaumont road also contained many elderly homes, Victorian houses and bungalows. Beaumont road when completed contained; three tower blocks, twenty-three low rise blocks, bungalows, homes for the elderly, shops and a community center. Complete with 898 flats with a population of 4,490.

The original estate comprised:
 All Saints Tower
 St Cathrine's Tower
 St Paul's Tower
 St Thomas Court
 St Elizabeth Court
 St Edward's Court
 St Josephs Court
 St Mathews Court
 St Mark's Court
 St Lukes Court
 Flack Court
 Emanuel Court
 Ayerst Court
 Muriel Court
 Russel Court
 Osbourne Court
 Howell Court
 Kings Close
 Dare Court
 Staton Court
 Shelly Court
 Emmanuel Court
 Atkinson Court
 Shop Court
With
 Beaumont bungalows
 Beaumont House
 Beaumont Primary school
 Beaumont newsagents
 Beaumont Community centre
 Beaumont Cyber centre
 Leyton Community support centre
 The Six Bells pub

Redevelopment 

Demolition of the original Beaumont road housing, including the two towers, began during early 2006. The estate is due to be redeveloped as part of a regeneration programme set to last three years and cost over £40 million.

Planned to replace the 40-year-old estate are a series of "squares and neighbourhoods around a central, tree-lined avenue on Beaumont Road and reinstated the road's pre-war route.". Some of the squares will be on the sites of the original towers. A total of 306 new properties will be built in three phases over the projects three years, of which some will be social housing.

The towers themselves have dominated the skyline in and around Bakers Arms and their demolition will mean Waltham Forest will have only one remaining high-rise over 20 floors, Northwood Tower. This is down from a peak of 20 in 1971.

Media 
'Home' was the first production of site-specific theatre company Offstage Theatre UK and received media coverage on TV with news reports on Channel 4, ITN, BBC London as well as national and international papers. Directed by Cressida Brown, Home was performed promenade in St Catherine's Tower prior to its demolition in January 2006. The play text was inspired by interviews with the residents on the estate while Flat 14 on the 9th floor was designed with installations of found objects as well as the competition pictures of the local primary children, painted murals of the early teen crews, and graffiti of local tagger Edge. It was written by Gbolahan Obisesan to give the community of Beaumont estate a chance to "document what the area means to them." Rap, video projections of climbing the towers and acted scenes were used to recount stories of life in Beaumont in one flat in the tower with the audience moving from room to room to follow the story.

References

External links
"A bird's eye view about to be changed forever" By Sarah Cosgrove Waltham Forest Guardian, Friday 11 August 2006.

Housing estates in the London Borough of Waltham Forest
Leyton
Site-specific theatre